The Blacksburg salamander (Plethodon jacksoni) is a species of salamander in the family Plethodontidae. It is endemic to the Southeastern United States, where it is restricted to the Appalachian Mountains in southwestern Virginia and northwestern North Carolina. It is named after the town of Blacksburg, Virginia, as its first recorded sighting was within its vicinity. Its natural habitat is temperate forest.

Taxonomy
Shortly after its initial description, it was considered to be a southern population of the Wehrle's salamander (P. wehrlei) and was lumped in with it for many years, but a 2019 study recovered it as a distinct species, finding P. wehrlei to be a paraphyletic taxon. However, not all taxonomic issues within P. jacksoni were solved during the study, and thus P. jacksoni itself may be paraphyletic. The holotype was collected in Montgomery County, Virginia.

References

Plethodon
Amphibians of the United States
Endemic fauna of the United States
Ecology of the Appalachian Mountains
Amphibians described in 1954